Omni is the fourth full-length album from Minus the Bear, released on May 4, 2010. It is their first album to be released on Dangerbird Records and was produced by Grammy Award-winner, Joe Chiccarelli (The White Stripes, My Morning Jacket).
On April 27, 2009, the band began recording without the support of a record label. On September 3, 2009, they announced on their Twitter that they were officially done recording.

On October 27, 2009, they self-released an EP, Into the Mirror, featuring a brand new track from the forthcoming album titled "Into the Mirror," and a b-side from the recording sessions titled "Broken China." This was released on a 7" vinyl that was sold exclusively at shows, and through various digital outlets on the internet.

In February, 2010, the band announced that they had signed to Dangerbird Records. Soon after, the title, track list, and release date of their new album was unveiled.

On March 3, 2010, the album's first single, "My Time," was made available for free download on the album's official website.

On April 19, 2010, the album became available for free streaming on KCRW's Official site.

Track listing

Recording and release

Omni is different from the previous Minus the Bear studio albums in that it was recorded in the style of a live show, with the band playing straight through each track rather than recording components of each track and "piecing" them together.

The album was released early for Internet streaming by KCRW, a National Public Radio affiliate based in Santa Monica, CA on April 19, 2010. Lead singer Jake Snider endorsed this release, asserting that it added energy to live shows, as fans already knew the new songs

Personnel

Minus the Bear
 Jake Snider - Lead vocals, Guitar
 Dave Knudson - Guitar, Omnichord
 Erin Tate - Drums
 Cory Murchy - Bass
 Alex Rose - Keyboards, Vocals

Additional personnel
 Produced by Joe Chiccarelli and Minus The Bear
 Mixed by Joe Chiccarelli
 Mastered by Emily Lazar and Joe Laporta
 Additional recording by Jake Snider and Alex Rose
 Additional vocals on "Into The Mirror" by Rachel Flotard, courtesy of Visqueen and Local 638 Records
 Recording Assistant: Jonny Mendoza
 Assistant Engineer: Jay Follette
 Assistant Engineer: Eric Corson
 Track Editor: Lars Fox
 Drum Tech: Gregg Keplinger
 Additional Drum Tech: Phil Petrocelli
 Guitar Tech: John Stephan
 Keyboard Tech: Kurt Bujack

References

Minus the Bear albums
2010 albums
Dangerbird Records albums
Albums produced by Joe Chiccarelli